WPMB 1500 AM is a radio station licensed to Vandalia, Illinois.  The station broadcasts an adult contemporary format and is owned by Cromwell Radio Group, through licensee The Cromwell Group, Inc. of Illinois.

Translators
WPMB is also heard on 102.7 FM through a translator in Greenville, Illinois and on 104.7 FM through a translator in Vandalia, Illinois.

References

External links
WPMB's webpage

Mainstream adult contemporary radio stations in the United States
PMB